The Kaiserwagen (Emperor's car) is a carriage car built for the Wuppertal Schwebebahn (suspension railway) in 1900. A replica of the original carriage still periodically operates.

German Emperor Wilhelm II and his consort Augusta Victoria of Schleswig-Holstein rode in the original carriage when they visited Wuppertal on 24 October 1900. Both the carriage, and the overall suspension-railway system, have been designated protected monuments since 26 May 1997.

A replica of the Kaiserwagen is currently available for private charters such as weddings, meetings, and ceremonies, in addition to being used for tourists and in publicity by the railway operators.

External links 

 Infos zum Kaiserwagen und Buchungsmöglichkeiten (German)
 Hauptuntersuchung des Kaiserwagens (German)

References 

Wuppertal Schwebebahn